Cengiz Holding A.S. is a Turkish conglomerate, with major interests in construction, energy, mining, and tourism. Its assets include the Eti Copper and Eti Aluminium mining companies. It is owned by Mehmet Cengiz. In 2012 it had around $470m revenue from construction.

In May 2013 it was part of a joint venture which won the EUR22bn contract to construct a third international airport in Istanbul. In July 2013 it was part of a joint venture which acquired the daily newspaper Akşam, together with TV channel Sky Turk 360 and radio station Alem FM, for TL60m.

Sustainability 
The company says that "Emissions at the [aluminium] production units in Seydişehir are already 50% lower than European Union standards", however it still runs a small coal-fired power station at that factory.

References

External links
Official Website

Conglomerate companies of Turkey
Companies based in Istanbul
Holding companies established in 1980
Turkish companies established in 1980
Construction and civil engineering companies established in 1980
Construction and civil engineering companies of Turkey
Holding companies of Turkey
Coal companies of Turkey